Jessica van der Spil (born June 18, 1979 in Goes) is a Dutch female judoka.

Achievements

References

1979 births
Living people
Dutch female judoka
Sportspeople from Goes
Universiade medalists in judo
Universiade bronze medalists for the Netherlands
Medalists at the 2003 Summer Universiade
21st-century Dutch women